The Tampa Open is a defunct Grand Prix affiliated tennis tournament played from 1981 to 1983. It was held in Tampa, Florida in the United States and played on outdoor hard courts from 1981 to 1982 and on indoor carpet courts in 1983.

Finals

Singles

Doubles

See also
 Eckerd Open – women's tournament (1971–1990) held in Tampa Bay Area

References
 ATP Results Archive

Tampa Open
Hard court tennis tournaments in the United States
Carpet court tennis tournaments
Grand Prix tennis circuit
1981 establishments in Florida
1983 disestablishments in Florida
Recurring sporting events established in 1981
Recurring sporting events disestablished in 1983
Sports competitions in Tampa, Florida